Penicillium venetum is a species of fungus in the genus Penicillium which produces roquefortine C and roquefortine D.

References

venetum
Fungi described in 2000